was a  of the Imperial Japanese Navy.

Design and description
The Yūgumo class was a repeat of the preceding  with minor improvements that increased their anti-aircraft capabilities. Their crew numbered 228 officers and enlisted men. The ships had two Kampon geared steam turbines, each driving one propeller shaft, using steam provided by three Kampon water-tube boilers.

The main armament of the Yūgumo class consisted of six Type 3  guns in three twin-gun turrets, one superfiring pair aft and one turret forward of the superstructure. The guns were able to elevate up to 75° to increase their ability against aircraft, but their slow rate of fire, slow traversing speed, and the lack of any sort of high-angle fire-control system meant that they were virtually useless as anti-aircraft guns. They were built with four Type 96  anti-aircraft guns in two twin-gun mounts, but more of these guns were added over the course of the war. The ships were also armed with eight  torpedo tubes in a two quadruple traversing mounts; one reload was carried for each tube. Their anti-submarine weapons comprised two depth charge throwers for which 36 depth charges were carried.

Construction and career
At the Battle of Leyte Gulf and the Battle of Sibuyan Sea Kiyoshimo was assigned to the 1st Diversion Attack Force. During an air attack, the destroyer received one direct hit and five near misses. She assisted the battleship Musashi and rescued survivors after the crew of Musashi abandoned ship. She was repaired 8–12 November at Singapore.

On 26 December 1944, then with the San Jose bombardment force, Kiyoshimo was crippled by two direct bomb hits in attacks by U.S. Army bombers during the approach to Mindoro, Philippines. The destroyer  rescued 169 survivors, including ComDesDiv 2, Captain Shiraishi Nagayoshi, and Lieutenant Commander Kajimoto; U.S. PT boats rescued five others.

Notes

References

External links
 CombinedFleet.com: Yūgumo-class destroyers
 CombinedFleet.com: Kiyoshimo history
bosamar.com: YUGUMO CLASS DESTROYER

Yūgumo-class destroyers
World War II destroyers of Japan
World War II shipwrecks in the South China Sea
1944 ships
Maritime incidents in December 1944
Ships built by Uraga Dock Company